Cynthia Lee Nelson (born August 19, 1955) is former World Cup alpine ski racer from the United States.

Racing career
Born and raised in Lutsen in northeastern Minnesota, Nelson's family ran the local ski area and she was on skis before the age of three. She raced in all five alpine disciplines, with a focus on downhill, and was on the World Cup squad of the U.S. Ski Team at age 16. Nelson won the silver medal in the downhill at the 1982 World Championships and was the bronze medalist in the downhill at the 1976 Winter Olympics.

During her first World Cup season, she had two top-15 finishes in downhill as the 1972 Winter Olympics neared. She was expected to make the U.S. Olympic team, but dislocated a hip in a downhill at Grindelwald on January 18, two weeks before the games began. She missed those Winter Olympics but competed in 1976, 1980, and 1984. Two years after her hip injury she won her first World Cup race back at Grindelwald in 1974, the first-ever American to gain a World Cup victory in downhill. Nelson's only victory in a World Cup giant slalom was also her only win in North America, in the rain at Whistler, British Columbia. She retired from international competition after the 1985 season with six World Cup wins, 26 podiums, and 123 top ten finishes.

World Cup results

Season standings

Race victories
 6 wins – (3 DH, 1 SG, 1 GS, 1 K)
 23 podiums – (15 DH, 1 SG, 4 GS, 1 SL, 1 K)

 Nelson also won an unofficial Super-G race on March 23, 1982, a test event in San Sicario, Italy.

World Championship results 

From 1948 through 1980, the Winter Olympics were also the World Championships for alpine skiing.
At the World Championships from 1954 through 1980, the combined was a "paper race" using the results of the three events (DH, GS, SL).

Olympic results

Other
In 1979, the Supersisters trading card set was produced and distributed; one of the cards featured Nelson's name and picture.

References

External links

 
 Cindy Nelson World Cup standings at the International Ski Federation 
 
 

1955 births
Living people
American female alpine skiers
Olympic bronze medalists for the United States in alpine skiing
Medalists at the 1976 Winter Olympics
Alpine skiers at the 1976 Winter Olympics
Alpine skiers at the 1980 Winter Olympics
Alpine skiers at the 1984 Winter Olympics
21st-century American women